Orthocomotis euchaldera is a species of moth of the family Tortricidae. It is found in Colombia, Ecuador (Morona-Santiago Province, Napo Province, Pichincha Province) and Peru.

Subspecies
Orthocomotis euchaldera euchaldera (Colombia)
Orthocomotis euchaldera domonoana Razowski & Pelz, 2003 (Ecuador: Morona-Santiago Province)

References

Moths described in 1956
Orthocomotis